Kovář (meaning "smith"; feminine Kovářová ) is a Czech surname.

Kovář or Kovar may refer to:
 Daniela Kovářová (born 1964), Czech politician
 Dennis G. Kovar, American physicist
 František Kovář (1888–1969), Czech Hussite bishop
 Jakub Kovář (born 1988), Czech ice hockey player
 Jan Kovář (born 1990), Czech ice hockey player
 Jaroslav Kovář (1934–2015), Czech athlete
 Jiří Kovář (born 1989), Italian volleyball player of Czech origin
 Karel Kovář (rower) (born 1942), Czech rower
 Karel Kovář, Slovak figure skater
 Lukáš Kovář (born 1992), Czech ice hockey player
 Marie Kovářová (born 1927), Czech gymnast
 Mary Grace Kovar (1929–2015), American biostatistician
 Matěj Kovář (born 2000), Czech footballer
 Michal Kovář (born 1973), Czech footballer
 Přemysl Kovář (born 1985), Czech footballer
 Robin Kovář (born 1984), Czech ice hockey player
 Sára Kovářová (born 1999), Czech handballer
 Zdeněk Kovář (1917–2004), Czech designer

See also
 
 

Czech-language surnames